Edgar Laurence "Dunc" Gray (17 July 190630 August 1996) was an Australian track cyclist and Olympian.

Gray was born in Goulburn, New South Wales. He was called 'Dunc', which dates back to school where he was called 'Dunc' and this was later extended to 'Duncan'. He started competitive cycling with Goulburn Amateur Cycling Club around 1925. From 1926 to 1941 he won 20 Australian titles, 36 New South Wales titles, and 36 club championships. On eight occasions he was the NSW 1000m time trial and/or the 1000m sprint winner.

He won a bronze medal for the 1000m time trial at the 1928 Summer Olympics in Amsterdam. This was Australia's first Olympic Games medal in cycling. At the 1932 Summer Olympics in Los Angeles he won Australia's first cycling gold in the same event, in world record time of 1m 13s. He represented Australia at the 1934 British Empire Games and won the 1000m time trial. At the 1938 British Empire Games in Sydney, he won the 1000m sprint.

He was the flag-bearer for Australia at the 1936 Summer Olympics in Berlin and at the 1938 British Empire Games.

In his last years, Gray lived in Kiama and supported the Olympic movement, including Melbourne's bid for the 1996 Summer Olympics and then Sydney's successful bid for the 2000 Summer Olympics. The Dunc Gray Velodrome at Bass Hill, in Sydney's western suburbs, was built for the 2000 Summer Olympics in Sydney and named after him.
 
The Speedwell bike that Gray rode at the 1932 Summer Olympics is at the Dunc Gray velodrome. Speedwell bicycles were manufactured by Charles Bennett, a former Intercolonial Champion of Australia, who raced pennyfathings before Federation in 1901.

In 1985, Gray was inducted into the Sport Australia Hall of Fame. In 2015, he was an inaugural Cycling Australia Hall of Fame inductee.

References

External links 
 
 1996 Interview with Dunc Gray
 

1906 births
1996 deaths
People from Goulburn
Australian male cyclists
Olympic cyclists of Australia
Australian track cyclists
Olympic gold medalists for Australia
Olympic bronze medalists for Australia
Cyclists at the 1928 Summer Olympics
Cyclists at the 1932 Summer Olympics
Cyclists at the 1936 Summer Olympics
Cyclists at the 1934 British Empire Games
Cyclists at the 1938 British Empire Games
Commonwealth Games gold medallists for Australia
Cyclists from New South Wales
Olympic medalists in cycling
Sport Australia Hall of Fame inductees
Medalists at the 1928 Summer Olympics
Medalists at the 1932 Summer Olympics
Commonwealth Games medallists in cycling
20th-century Australian people
Medallists at the 1934 British Empire Games
Medallists at the 1938 British Empire Games